Emma Sralla (born 26 September 2004) is a Swedish-American track and field athlete who won the discus at the 2022 World Athletics Junior Championships.

Personal life
Sralla attends Edward S. Marcus High School in Flower Mound, Texas. With a Swedish mother and an American father, she has dual Swedish-American nationality. Her mother Anna moved to America aged 18 to play college golf and met Emma’s father Scott. Emma was born and raised in Texas but would visit family in Sweden every year. When in Sweden she competed for Spårvägen.

Career 
Representing Sweden, Sralla won the discus competition at the 2022 World Athletics U20 Championships in Cali, Colombia. With a winning throw of 56.15m she finished nearly 2 metres ahead of her nearest rival, Greece’s Déspina-Aretí Filippídou who threw 54.48.

References

External links

2004 births
Living people
Swedish female discus throwers
World Athletics U20 Championships winners
Track and field athletes from Texas
American female discus throwers
American people of Swedish descent